Baltasar Silva (born November 19, 1984 in Tacuarembó, Uruguay) is a former Uruguayan footballer whose last team was Tacuarembó.

External links
 Profile at BDFA 
 
 Profile at Tenfield Digital

1984 births
Living people
People from Tacuarembó Department
Uruguayan footballers
Uruguayan expatriate footballers
Club Atlético River Plate (Montevideo) players
Tacuarembó F.C. players
Peñarol players
Juventud Unida de Gualeguaychú players
Club Plaza Colonia de Deportes players
C.A. Cerro players
Association football defenders
Uruguayan expatriate sportspeople in Argentina
Expatriate footballers in Argentina